This article is a list of modern pagan temples and other religious buildings and structures, sorted alphabetically by country and city.

Map (WIP)

Brazil
 Templo Piaga, Vila Pagã, José de Freitas (Piauí).
 Templo Piaga das Almas, Vila Pagã, José de Freitas (Piauí).
 Templo Casa Telucama, Lauro de Freitas, Bahia.

Bulgaria 

 Thracian Temple, Starosel.

Denmark
Manheim, Korinth

Greece

Temple of Alexander and the Earth (Ναός του Αλεξάνδρου και της Γης), in Mesaio, Central Macedonia
Temple of the Hellenic Gods (Ελληνων Ναος), in Oraiokastro, Central Macedonia.

Iceland
Ásaheimur Hof, Efri Ás, Skagafjörður
Arctic Henge (Heimskautsgerðið), Raufarhöfn

Italy
Temple of Jupiter (Templum Iovis), Torre Gaia, Rome
Tempio della Grande Dea, Rome
Tempio della Dea Minerva, Pordenone.
Tempio di Apollo, Ardea.
Tempio di Apollo, Palermo, Sicily.

Latvia
Lokstene Shrine of Dievturi (Lokstenes dievturu svētnīca), Klintaine Parish

Lithuania

Samogitian Sanctuary (Žemaičių Alkas), Šventoji
Temple of four gods and four goddesses from Baltic mythology in the undergrounds of Vilnius University.

Netherlands
Temple of Nehalennia (a local deity of Germanic mythology) in Colijnsplaat.

Poland
 Mazovian Chram of Native Polish Church, Michałowice District, Masovian Voivodeship
 Chram Stokroć of Rodzima Wiara, around Olsztyn, Warmian-Masurian Voivodeship
 Sanctuary of Veles, Wałbrzych, Lower Silesian Voivodeship
 Ślężańskie Trzebiszcze, Ślęża Massif, Lower Silesian Voivodeship
 Gajowniki – chapel of Mokosh and idol of Światowid, Gajowniki, Podlaskie Voivodeship
 Statue of Światowid,Luboń Wielki,Rabka Zdrój,Lesser Polish voivodeship

Portugal

 Trebaruna, Centro Druídico da Lusitânia, Reguengos de Monsaraz.

Russia
Slavic Kremlin by Sundakov, Podolsky District, Moscow Oblast (a kremlin, i.e. fortress compound, with various facilities for Rodnover ceremonies, including a temple)
Temple of Svarozhich's Fire of the Union of Slavic Native Belief Communities, Krasotinka village, Kaluga Oblast
Temple of the Wisdom of Perun in Omsk of the Ynglings
House of Purification/Archie Diete, Tengrist "Aiyy Faith" temple (2002), Yakutsk, Yakutia, taken away by the local authorities
It is important to note that the number of pagan temples in Russia and Ukraine is almost definitely underestimated here, as Slavic neopaganism has a large following in both countries as well as an often tense relationship with the local authorities.

Spain

Templo de Gaut, Albacete

United Kingdom
Glastonbury Goddess Temple, Glastonbury
White Spring Well and Temple, Glastonbury
Odinist Fellowship Temple, Newark-On-Trent
Sheffield Goddess Temple, Sheffield

United States

 Baldurshof, Asatru Folk Assembly temple, Murdock, Minnesota
 Church of Eternal Light, Pagan Spiritualist, Bristol, Connecticut
Isis Oasis retreat center and temple, Geyserville, California
NewGrange Hall Asatru Hof, Brownsville, Yuba County, California
RUNVira Temple of Mother Ukraine-Oryana, Spring Glen, New York, in the Catskill Mountains
Sekhmet Temple, Cactus Springs, Nevada
Temple to Aphrodite, Camp Midian, Springville, Indiana
The Catskills Phygianum of the Maetreum of Cybele, Palenville, New York
The Goddess Temple of Ashland, Ashland, Oregon.
 Thorshof, Asatru Folk Assembly temple, Linden, North Carolina

Ukraine 

 The temple of Iuppiter Perunus, Poltava

Planned and under construction
Hof Ásatrúarfélagsins is being built by Ásatrúarfélagið in Reykjavik, Iceland. It has been delayed several times and is now being built in separate stages.
A Slavic Native Faith temple is being built in Wrocław, Poland.
Centre of the Rodnover Communities of Krasnoyarsk "Rodunitsa" (Общины Родноверов Красноярья "Родуница"; for short: ОРКхолл, ORKxoll), the gorodok (citadel) of the Rodnover communities of Krasnoyarsk, Russia (in progress);
Ynglist Church temples (planned):
 Temple of Veles (Капища Велеса), Omsk;
 Temple of Yngly (Капища Инглии), Omsk.
 Slavic Temple in Khabarovsk (planned).
 Atlanta Heathen Hof, a temple of the group Vör Forn Siðr, is being built 10 miles outside Atlanta, Georgia in the United States. Its projected completion date is 2022.
The plans for a Native Ukrainian National Faith religious building in the village of Zmiinets outside Lutsk in Ukraine were approved by the local authorities on 7 June 2019.

See also 
 List of Ancient Greek temples
 List of Ancient Roman temples
 List of Buddhist temples
 List of Hindu temples
 List of Mazu temples
 List of Shinto shrines

References

Lists of religious buildings and structures
 
Modern paganism-related lists